A. Anne McLellan   (born August 31, 1950) is a Canadian politician and academic who served as the ninth deputy prime minister of Canada from 2003 to 2006. She was a cabinet minister in the Liberal governments of Jean Chrétien and Paul Martin, and represented Edmonton in the House of Commons of Canada. She also held the positions of solicitor general, minister of health, and minister of justice of Canada.

Early life 
McLellan earned bachelor's degrees in Arts and Law from Halifax's Dalhousie University.  She then earned a Master of Laws from King's College London in the United Kingdom in 1975.

She became a professor of law, first at the University of New Brunswick and then, beginning in 1980, at the University of Alberta Faculty of Law where she served at various times as associate dean and dean. She has also served on the board of directors of the Canadian Civil Liberties Association.

Political career 
Her first foray into politics was as the Liberal candidate for the riding of Edmonton Northwest in the 1993 general election, when she won her seat by 12 votes.  She quickly became a rising star in the Liberal Party, being one of four Liberals elected in Alberta, and was named to cabinet as Minister of Natural Resources. McLellan has the prenominal "the Honourable" and the postnominal "PC" for life by virtue of being made a member of the Queen's Privy Council for Canada on November 4, 1993.

She was re-elected by narrow margins in the new riding of Edmonton West in the 1997 and 2000 elections, despite the Liberals' general unpopularity in Alberta.  Her frequent narrow escapes gave her the nickname "Landslide Annie" in Canadian political circles.

McLellan served as Minister of Justice from 1997 to 2002, with responsibility for implementing new anti-terror and security laws following the September 11, 2001, attacks in the United States, and the implementation of the Canadian gun registry.  She served as Minister of Health from 2002 to 2003.

Though she supported Paul Martin for the Liberal leadership, she was kept in Jean Chrétien's cabinet, in part because Chrétien wanted an Albertan in his cabinet for the sake of regional representation.

Deputy prime minister 
On being sworn-in as Prime Minister on December 12, 2003, Paul Martin named her his deputy prime minister.  McLellan was also named minister for the newly created Department of Public Safety and Emergency Preparedness. As Deputy Prime Minister, she was also chair of the Cabinet Operations Committee. McLellan's appointment was one of a number of women given senior positions in the Paul Martin government.

During the 2004 federal election, she was re-elected by 721 votes, or just over 1% of the vote, defeating Laurie Hawn of the Conservative Party of Canada in the riding of Edmonton Centre.

In the 2006 federal election, McLellan was defeated by Hawn 45.01% to 38.36%.

McLellan is one of the few Canadian parliamentarians to have spent her entire career as a cabinet member. This is due to the fact that McLellan was elected to parliament as a Liberal from Alberta, a historically weak province for the party. Serving as the only Liberal MP from the province, her inclusion as a cabinet member, and later elevation as Deputy Prime Minister, was tantamount to ensuring regional representation.

After politics 
On May 12, 2006, McLellan was appointed Distinguished Scholar in Residence to the University of Alberta at the Canadian university's Institute for United States Policy Studies. On June 27, 2006, she also became counsel to the Edmonton-based law firm Bennett Jones LLP. She also became a director on the boards of Nexen Inc., Agrium Inc. and Cameco Corporation.
McClellan is currently Chair of the Board of Directors of Pearson College UWC in Victoria, B.C. Pearson is one of 18 global United World Colleges in the world.

On July 1, 2009, McLellan was appointed an officer of the Order of Canada for her service as a politician and law professor, and for her contributions as a community volunteer. On May 9, 2013, she was appointed to the Alberta Order of Excellence for her achievements in politics, law and advanced education.

In 2015, she was appointed Chancellor of Dalhousie University.

In 2016, McLellan was controversially appointed as the chair of the Task Force on Marijuana Legalization and Regulation, created to provide recommendations on the design of a new system to legalize, strictly regulate and restrict recreational use of marijuana, despite her position within Bennett Jones. The process included an opportunity for the public to provide their own input.  On December 13, 2016, the panel's report was released to the news media; its recommendations were not binding on the legislators.

On November 28, 2017, Pearson College UWC named her the chair of its board of directors.

On March 18, 2019, in the context of the SNC-Lavalin affair Prime Minister Justin Trudeau, announced that McLellan would serve as a special advisor on whether a single minister should continue to hold the positions of Minister of Justice and Attorney General of Canada.  She was also asked to analyze the operating policies and practices across the Cabinet, and the role of public servants and political staff in their interactions with the minister of justice and attorney general of Canada.  She was asked to provide independent recommendations (sic) to the Prime Minister by June 30, 2019.

On October 29, 2019, following the 2019 Canadian federal election, in which the Liberal Party did not win any seats in Alberta and Saskatchewan, the Prime Minister's Office announced that Prime Minister Justin Trudeau had hired McLellan as an adviser. The Office said McLellan would assist the prime minister as he formed a government against the backdrop of a growing sentiment of western alienation.

On July 23, 2020 it was announced by Nova Scotia justice minister Mark Furey and federal minister of public safety and emergency preparedness Bill Blair that McLellan would serve on a 3-person Independent Review Panel concerning the RCMP response to the mass shooting that occurred in Nova Scotia on April 18/19, 2020. Families of the 22 victims killed during the shooting reacted to the announcement with disappointment, as they had been calling for a full public inquiry.

Notes

References

External links 
 Canadian Encyclopedia entry for Anne McLellan
 Official Site
 

1950 births
Living people
Lawyers in Alberta
Alumni of King's College London
Canadian legal scholars
Canadian Ministers of Health
Women government ministers of Canada
Canadian women lawyers
Women members of the House of Commons of Canada
Canadian people of Ulster-Scottish descent
Schulich School of Law alumni
Dalhousie University alumni
Deputy Prime Ministers of Canada
Liberal Party of Canada MPs
Members of the 26th Canadian Ministry
Members of the 27th Canadian Ministry
Members of the Alberta Order of Excellence
Members of the House of Commons of Canada from Alberta
Members of the King's Privy Council for Canada
Mining ministers of Canada
Officers of the Order of Canada
People from Hants County, Nova Scotia
Politicians from Edmonton
Solicitors General of Canada
Academic staff of the University of Alberta
Academic staff of the University of New Brunswick
Women in Alberta politics
21st-century Canadian women politicians
20th-century Canadian women politicians
Women legal scholars
Female justice ministers